Sri Lanka competed at the 1984 Summer Olympics in Los Angeles, United States.

Sailing

 Ranil Dias
 Lalin Jirasinha

Swimming

 Julian Bolling
Men's 400m Freestyle
 Heat — 4:23.42 (→ did not advance, 36th place)

Men's 1500m Freestyle
 Heat — 17:16.92 (→ did not advance, 27th place)

Men's 400m Individual Medley
 Heat — 5:02.88 (→ did not advance, 21st place)

Weightlifting

References

Official Olympic Reports
Sri Lanka at the 1984 Los Angeles Summer Games

Nations at the 1984 Summer Olympics
1984
1984 in Sri Lankan sport